Todd Tozama Matshikiza (1921–1968) was a South African jazz pianist, composer and journalist.

Overview
Matshikiza came from a musical family. He graduated from St Peter's College in Rosettenville, Johannesburg, and went on to obtain a diploma in music and a teaching diploma. He then taught English and Mathematics in Alice until 1947. During this period, Matshikiza composed songs and choral works; in particular "Hamba Kahle", now a standard South Africa piece.

Matshikiza moved to Johannesburg in 1947 where he got married in 1950. He taught for a while and opened the Todd Matshikiza School of Music, a private music school, where he taught piano. His main interest was jazz. As this did not bring in a regular income, he worked in a bookshop and then as a salesman.

From 1949 to 1954, Matshikiza was a committee member of the Syndicate of African Artists, which group aimed to promote music in the townships by getting visiting artists to perform there.

In 1952, Matshikiza was asked to join Drum magazine and was one of the first writers, together with investigative journalist Henry Nxumalo. He wrote a jazz column covering the township scene, particularly in Sophiatown, where he commented on the likes of Kippie Moeketsi and Hugh Masekela, who both played for The Jazz Epistles. Matshikiza also covered township life in his regular column "With the lid off". He subsequently worked for the Golden City Post.

His love of classical music inspired him to compose the choral piece Makhaliphile in 1953, which he dedicated to Trevor Huddleston. This was a combination of classical, jazz and traditional themes. In 1956, he composed Uxolo (peace), commissioned for the 70th anniversary of Johannesburg.

In 1958, Matshikiza composed the music and contributed to the lyrics of the musical King Kong, which had an all-black cast. Portraying the life and times of a heavyweight boxer, Ezekiel Dlamini, known as King Kong, this musical was a hit in 1959 and played in the West End of London in 1961. (King Kong launched the international career of Miriam Makeba, who played the shebeen queen of the Back of the Moon, a shebeen of the time in Sophiatown).

Frustrated by apartheid, Matshikiza moved to England in 1960. However, he found it very difficult to break into the English music scene. Sometimes he played jazz gigs in nightclubs. He freelanced for various publications and wrote a regular column for Drum entitled "Todd in London".

Missing Africa, Matshikiza moved in 1964 to Zambia, where he worked for the Zambian Broadcasting Corporation.  Again, he felt stifled musically and took up a position in 1967 as the music archivist for the Zambian Information Service. In this capacity he travelled extensively, building up the archival collection. Matshikiza remained frustrated that he was unable to return to South Africa where he had been banned by the South African government. He died in 1968.

Todd's son John Matshikiza was a world-renowned actor in television and film. John died on 15 September 2008 in Johannesburg, aged 54.

Todd's granddaughter, Lindi Matshikiza, has followed in the footsteps of her father and grandfather before her, becoming a rising theatre actress and director herself.

Books

 Chocolates for My Wife, Todd Matshikiza, Hodder & Stoughton, 1961. David Philip Publishers, 1982, 
 With the Lid Off: South African Insights from Home and Abroad, 1959-2000, T. Matshikiza J. Matshikiza., M&G Books,

References

External links
 Todd Matshikiza’s entry in the Dictionary of African composers

1921 births
1968 deaths
Xhosa people
South African journalists
South African composers
South African male composers
20th-century composers
20th-century male musicians
20th-century journalists